Abdulaziz Ibraim Al-Mansor (born 25 August 1990) is a Saudi football player .

Honours
Al-Ettifaq
 Saudi First Division: 2015–16
Al-Fayha
 Saudi First Division: 2016–17

References

1990 births
Living people
Saudi Arabian footballers
Al-Wehda Club (Mecca) players
Ettifaq FC players
Al-Fayha FC players
Al-Kawkab FC players
Al-Ain FC (Saudi Arabia) players
Place of birth missing (living people)
Saudi First Division League players
Saudi Professional League players
Association football defenders